Ziyuan 3-01 or ZY 3-01 ( meaning Resources 3) is a Chinese Earth observation satellite launched in January 2012. It is a high-resolution imaging satellite operated by the Ministry of Land and Resources of the People's Republic of China.

Spacecraft 
The Ziyuan 3 satellite was constructed by the China's China Academy of Space Technology (CAST), and carries three cameras produced by the Changchun Institute of Optics, Fine Machinery and Physics. The satellite is used to provide imagery to monitor resources, land use and ecology, and for use in urban planning and disaster management. The satellite has a planned operational lifetime of 4 years with a possible extension to 5 years.

Launch 
Ziyuan 3 was launched by a Long March 4B carrier rocket, flying from Launch Complex 9 at the Taiyuan Satellite Launch Center. The launch occurred at 03:17:00 UTC on 9 January 2012, and was the first orbital launch of the year. VesselSat-2 was launched as a secondary payload on the same rocket.

References

External links 
 China launches Ziyuan III satellite
 China's Ziyuan III satellite sends back hi-res images

Spacecraft launched in 2012
2012 in China
Reconnaissance satellites of China
Spacecraft launched by Long March rockets